"Get It on the Floor" is a song by American hip hop recording artist DMX, released as the second single from his fifth album Grand Champ (2003). The song features vocals and production from longtime collaborator, American record producer Swizz Beatz. The song peaked at No. 57 on the Billboard Hot R&B/Hip-Hop Songs chart, No. 43 on the German Singles Chart and No. 34 on the UK Singles Chart.

Charts

Track listing
 Get It on the Floor featuring Swizz Beatz (Radio)
 Get It on the Floor featuring Swizz Beatz (Dirty)
 Get It on the Floor (Instrumental)
 We 'Bout to Blow featuring Big Stan (Radio)
 We 'Bout to Blow featuring Big Stan (Dirty)
 We 'Bout to Blow (Instrumental)

References

2003 singles
2003 songs
DMX (rapper) songs
Swizz Beatz songs
Ruff Ryders Entertainment singles
Def Jam Recordings singles
Hardcore hip hop songs
Song recordings produced by Swizz Beatz
Songs written by DMX (rapper)
Songs written by Swizz Beatz